Terrible Human Beings is the third studio album by American band The Orwells. It was released February 17, 2017, by Atlantic Records. It would be the band's final album released before their breakup in 2018, although it was followed with the self released The Orwells in 2019.

Track listing

References 

2017 albums
The Orwells albums
Atlantic Records albums
Albums produced by Jim Abbiss